"Brother" Bill Oliver (born November 1, 1939) is a former American football player and coach.  He served as a head football coach at the University of Tennessee at Chattanooga from 1980 to 1983 and at Auburn University for the final five games of the 1998 season, compiling a career college football record of 31–17–1.

Oliver attended the University of Alabama, where he played for Bear Bryant from 1959 to 1961 as a defensive back.  After coaching for high schools in Alabama, Oliver joined Auburn as a secondary coach in 1966 under coach Ralph Jordan.  Oliver remained at Auburn until 1970, when he left for the same position at Alabama.  In 1980, Oliver became head coach at the University of Tennessee at Chattanooga, a position he held until 1983.  Oliver was the defensive coordinator for the Memphis Showboats of the United States Football League in 1984 and 1985, and then coached the secondary at Clemson University.

In 1990, Gene Stallings hired Oliver as a secondary coach at Alabama and promoted him to defensive coordinator in 1993.  Alabama's athletic director, Hootie Ingram promised that Oliver would succeed Stallings as head coach, but Ingram was fired in 1995 when the program faced NCAA sanctions.  In 1996, Oliver accepted a position as Auburn's defensive coordinator, which he held until 1998.  After Terry Bowden resigned, Oliver served as interim head coach and was a candidate for the permanent position.  After Auburn hired Tommy Tuberville, Oliver retired from coaching football.

In May 2013, he was inducted into the Alabama Sports Hall of Fame.

Head coaching record

Notes

References

1939 births
Living people
American football defensive backs
Alabama Crimson Tide football coaches
Alabama Crimson Tide football players
Auburn Tigers football coaches
Chattanooga Mocs football coaches
Clemson Tigers football coaches
United States Football League coaches
High school football coaches in Alabama
People from Sumter County, Alabama
Coaches of American football from Alabama
Players of American football from Alabama